John Southwood may refer to:
 John Albert Southwood, Australian politician, newspaperman and trade unionist
 John Southwood (canoeist), Australian sprint canoeist